Warwick Ball is an Australia-born Near-Eastern archaeologist.

Ball has been involved in excavations, architectural studies and monumental restorations in Jordan, Iran, Iraq, Syria, Ethiopia and Afghanistan. As a lecturer, he has been involved with travel tours in Jordan, Iran, Syria, Crimea, Israel, Uzbekistan and Yemen.

Ball was formerly director of excavations at The British School of Archaeology in Iraq. He is the editor of the scholarly journal Afghanistan. His publications include Syria: A Historical and Architectural Guide (Melisende, 1997, revised 2006) and the volume The Monuments of Afghanistan, History, Archaeology and Architecture (I.B. Tauris, London 2008) which consists of photography of numerous rare archaeological sites no longer well accessible today for reasons of security.

He resides in Scotland.

References

External links
A Review of his works at UPenn.edu

Iranologists
Living people
Year of birth missing (living people)